The White Magnolia Plaza, also known as Sinar Mas Center, is a skyscraper whose construction was earlier suspended, but resumed construction in 2013, and was completed on January 4, 2017. It is located north of the Bund, the historic river-front district of Shanghai, adjacent to the international cruise terminal.

The building is owned by Sinar Mas Land, a subsidiary of Indonesian conglomerate Sinar Mas Group.

See also
 List of tallest buildings
 List of tallest buildings in Shanghai

References

External links
 White Magnolia Plaza on SOM.com (Skidmore, Owings & Merrill)
 
 
 
 
 

Skidmore, Owings & Merrill buildings
Skyscraper office buildings in Shanghai